Albania will compete at the 2019 World Championships in Athletics in Doha, Qatar, from 27 September to 6 October 2019. Albania will be represented by one athlete.

Results

References

Albania
World Athletics Championships
2019